Uqhu may refer to:

 Uqhu (Lima), a mountain in Lima Region, Peru
 Uqhu (Marcapomacocha), a mountain in Marcapomacocha District, Peru
 Uqhu (Yauli), a mountain in Yauli District, Peru